Tamworth is a city and administrative centre of the north-western region of New South Wales, Australia. Situated on the Peel River within the local government area of the Tamworth Regional Council, it is the largest and most populated city in the region, with a population of 63,920 in 2021, making it the second largest inland city in New South Wales.

The city is known as the "First Town of Lights", being the first place in Australia to use electric street lights in 1888. Tamworth is also famous as the "Country Music Capital of Australia", annually hosting the Tamworth Country Music Festival in late January; the second-biggest country music festival in the world after Nashville. The city is recognised as the National Equine Capital of Australia because of the high number of equine events held in the city and the construction of the world-class Australian Equine and Livestock Events Centre, the biggest of its kind in the Southern Hemisphere.

History
The Kamilaroi people, from whose language comes the word "budgerigar", inhabited the area before European contact. In 1818, John Oxley passed through the Peel Valley and commented, "it would be impossible to find a finer or more luxuriant country than its waters...No place in this world can afford more advantages to the industrious settler than this extensive vale".

In the 1830s, a company town began to develop on the Peel's southwest bank, the present site of West Tamworth. In 1850, a public town was gazetted on the opposite side of the river from the existing settlement. This town became the main town, called "Tamworth" after Tamworth, Staffordshire, represented at the time in parliament by Robert Peel. The town prospered, and was reached by the railway in 1878. The first streetlights used in Australia were commercially owned in Waratah Tasmania in 1886, but on 9 November 1888, Tamworth became the first location in Australia to have electric street lighting powered by a municipally owned power station, giving the town the title of "First Town of Light".

Gaol history
The first record of correctional facilities being established in Tamworth was on 17 December 1864 when the local Police Magistrate was appointed as the Visiting Justice at the Tawmorth Gaol. A gaoler and sheriff were appointed in 1868. At the commencement of 1920, there were 11 prisoners detained. During that year, 201 prisoners were received with 183 discharged leaving 29 in prison by 31 December 1920. Almost 20 per cent of the prisoners were aged under 21 years. The Tamworth Gaol ceased to exist on 25 March 1943, and this was ratified by a proclamation from 8 April 1943.

Prior to its opening as an adult male correctional centre in 1991, the facility (known variously as the Tamworth Institution for Boys, the Tamworth Boys’ Home, and Endeavour House) was a male juvenile justice centre that pre–dated the establishment of the Kariong Youth Correctional Centre which opened in September 1991.

Timeline
 1818 – Explorer John Oxley passes through the area on his exploration mission. Names the river that now runs through the town: Peel River, after British Prime Minister Robert Peel.
 1831 – First sheep and cattle stations, namely Joseph Brown's 'Wallamoul' and William Dangar's 'Waldoo'. The exploring expedition led by Major Mitchell visited 'Wallamoul' in December 1831 on its way to the north-west.
 1834 – 6000 sheep of the Australian Agriculture Company were the first to be brought to the Tamworth region.
 1851 – The white population of the village of Tamworth was 254.
 1852 – John Barnes built the Royal Oak Hotel.
 1861 – Population 543
 1866 – Tamworth Mechanics' Institute opened.
 1882 – Tamworth railway station opened.
 1883 – Tamworth base hospital opened.
 1888 – Power station opened and enables the beginning of electric street lighting. The first electric streetlights in Australia.
 1918 – A pedestal is unveiled as a memorial to the discovery of Tamworth district.
 1926 – An anchor from the HM survey ship Sealark is erected on the pedestal.
1935 - Radio 2TM began broadcasting. Tamworth's first radio station.
 1946 – Proclaimed a town.
 1947 – East-West Airlines was established in Tamworth, flying Tamworth to Sydney.
 1947 – Institution for Boys home for criminal youth opened.
 1973 – The first Australasian Country Music Festival was hosted in Tamworth by radio station 2TM, which has led to the extraordinary success of the Tamworth Country Music Festival that is held every year in Summer, at the end of January, a celebration that runs continuously for 11 days.
 1990s – The Local Council embarks on a successful campaign of urban and streetscape renewal, including the greening of Peel Street.
 1999 – Tamworth Regional Entertainment Centre is opened.
 2004 – A new local government area, Tamworth Regional Council, is formed from Tamworth town, Manilla Shire and parts of Parry, Nundle and Barraba Shires.
 2006 – In December the Tamworth Regional Council voted 6 to 3 against an offer from the Federal Government to take part in a one-year trial rural refugee resettlement programme; the majority of these refugees would be Sudanese escaping civil war in their homeland. Mayor of Tamworth, James Treloar, argued that the refugees being resettled were potentially diseased and criminal. The decision resulted in national and international media attention on the town. The public outrage unleashed by his comments and the summary decision to reject the refugees forced a reversal of the bill one month later, and Tamworth took part in the resettling program.
 2008 – The Australian Equine and Livestock Events Centre opened in September.
 2016 – Tamworth hosted the annual City vs Country Origin rugby league match at Scully Park Regional Sporting Precinct.
 2020 - Tamworth became the New Zealand Warriors Temporary Training and Isolation facility During the COVID-19 Pandemic

Geography
The city is situated at a narrow point on the Peel River floodplain, nestled at the base of the Wentworth Mounds, a spur of the Moonbi Range, where the Northwest Slopes rise to the Northern Tablelands. The elevation is around  AHD. The Peel River runs southeast to northwest through Tamworth. The southwest bank is much flatter, and the city's suburbs sprawl to the south.

The Tamworth Regional Council area encompasses the suburbs, towns, villages and rural localities of Appleby, Attunga, Banoon, Barraba (part), Barry, Bective, Bendemeer, Bithramere, Borah Creek, Bowling Alley Point, Bundarra (part), Calala, Crawney (part), Daruka, Duncans Creek, Dungowan, Duri, East Tamworth, Garoo, Garthowen, Gidley, Goonoo Goonoo, Gowrie, Gulf Creek (part), Halls Creek, Hallsville, Hanging Rock, Hillvue, Ironbark, Kentucky (part), Kingswood, Klori, Kootingal, Limbri, Lindesay, Longarm, Loomberah, Manilla, Mayvale, Moonbi, Moore Creek, Mulla Creek, Namoi River, Nemingha, New Mexico, Niangala (part), North Tamworth, Nundle, Ogunbil, Oxley Vale, Piallamore, Red Hill, Retreat, Rushes Creek, Somerton, South Tamworth, Taminda, Tamworth, Thirloene, Timbumburi, Tintinhull, Upper Horton (part), Upper Manilla, Wallamore, Warrabah, Warral, Watsons Creek, Weabonga, West Tamworth, Westdale, Wimborne, Winton, Wongo Creek, Woodsreef, Woolbrook (part) and Woolomin.

Climate
Tamworth has a warm climate with hot summers and mild winters. It is included in the rainfall records and weather forecast region of the North West Slopes or the North West Slopes and Plains division of the Bureau of Meteorology forecasts. Under the Köppen climate classification scheme, Tamworth has a humid subtropical climate (Cfa).

Temperatures exceed  on around 20–25 days a year, but over the past few years have exceeded this number substantially. Winters are mild and sometimes even warm by day, and cool to cold by night. This record has since been broken with a maximum of  recorded, during a significant heatwave, on 12 February 2017.

Rainfall is experienced all year round, with summer storms providing occasional heavy downpours. Tamworth's rainy season, in the early months of a new year (particularly January) can result in major flooding. Snow is very rare in Tamworth, but does occasionally occur in the surrounding higher villages such as Nundle (although far from reliable). Frosts are frequent and often severe. On 28 and 29 November 2008, Tamworth, Gunnedah, and the surrounding area received torrential rain that caused severe flooding and led to the area being declared a natural disaster area.

Demographics

According to the 2016 census of Population, 41,006 people were in Tamworth urban area.
 Aboriginal and/or Torres Strait Islander people made up 11.3% of the population.
 About 84.4% of people were born in Australia. The most common countries of birth were England 1.1%, the Philippines 1.0%, New Zealand 0.7%, India 0.5%, and South Korea 0.4%.
 Around 87.8% of people only spoke English at home. Other languages spoken at home included Mandarin 0.6%, Tagalog 0.5%, Korean 0.4%, and Filipino 0.3%.
 The most common responses for religion were Anglican 28.3%, Catholic 25.1%, and no religion 20.2%.

The estimated urban population of Tamworth at 30 June 2018 was 42,872, having grown, on average, slightly less than 1 percent year-on-year over the preceding five years. Tamworth had a working population of approximately 18,000 in 2008. At the  the industry sector in Tamworth with the most employees was School Education with almost 6 percent of the workforce.

Population for Tamworth Urban Area.

Suburbs

City
 Calala
 East Tamworth
 Hills Plains 
 Hillvue
 Kingswood
 Nemingha
 North Tamworth
 Oxley Vale
 South Tamworth
 Taminda (Tamworth Industrial Area)
 Tamworth Central Business District
 Westdale
 West Tamworth

Satellite suburbs
 Daruka Estate
 Duri
 Hallsville
 Kootingal
 Moore Creek
 Piallamore
 Tintinhull
 Dungowan

Central business district

The Tamworth central business district is the town centre and is located north of the Peel River. It is primarily a business area of Tamworth, with many shops, restaurants, car dealerships, as well as shopping centres and public facilities. The Tamworth Regional Council has its headquarters in Peel Street at Ray Walsh House. Bicentennial Park and number one cricket oval are also located in the suburb.

Economy

Tamworth is primarily a service centre for the New England and North West regions, providing services to a population of some 200,000 plus people from the Tamworth region and satellite areas. The retail industry is the biggest employer, followed by manufacturing and health services. The industries with the most number of businesses in order are property and business services, agriculture and construction, closely followed by finance and insurance services. With a diverse economy agriculture, education, transport and aviation are major industries.

Aviation
Aviation has been a significant part of the local economy, partly due to the town's exceptionally suitable flying weather, with the former East West Airlines and Eastern Airlines having had service and maintenance bases at the Tamworth Airport. Qantaslink currently conducts heavy maintenance on its DHC8-400 fleet at its Tamworth base. The Tamworth airport is home to the former Bae systems flight training academy complex, capable of accommodating and training up to 150 students at any time. New operators are currently being sought following the withdrawal of Bae from military flight training in 2020. The Australasian Pacific Aeronautical College and New England Institute of TAFE in the town also provide aeronautical training.

Agriculture

Agriculture is an important industry in the Tamworth economy. An estimated  of land are used for the agricultural industry, with an economic gross value of $75 million contributing to the Tamworth economy. 
Important agricultural activities include beef, sheep, grain, dairy, poultry and lucerne. Other agricultural areas include alpaca, buffalo, berry, fish, goat, hydroponic, nut, olive, and specialised game fowl farming, as well as wineries. Offices for the Department of Agriculture and the Department of Infrastructure, Planning and Natural Resources are located in Tamworth.

Equine and sporting horse events

Tamworth is recognised nationally as the sporting horse capital of Australia and is the headquarters of three major equine associations: CHA, ABCRA and AQHA. Many of the Australia's most important equine events take place in Tamworth. Various international, national and state championships are regularly held in the Tamworth district, as well as Australia's richest sporting horse event; the NCHA Futurity. Additionally, the ABCRA National Finals Rodeo occurs during the Tamworth Country Music Festival. Equine sports and their participation is very high in the Tamworth region amongst residents. The strength of the equine and sporting horse industry has resulted in hundreds of businesses and horse studs being located in the town's region.

Titles held in the town include: ABCRA National Finals and Junior National Finals, Australian Quarter Horse National Championships and Barrel Race Super Challenge, and the National Cutting Horse Association Futurity among many other events. These events were hosted at the Tamworth Showgrounds in the suburb of Taminda; however, they are now hosted at the new Australian Equine and Livestock Events Centre as of 2008. The Australian Equine and Livestock Events Centre has been built by the Tamworth Regional Council at a cost of $30 million. Construction of stage I began in June 2007 and was completed in October 2008. The centre has an indoor arena seating 3,360 people, stables for over 478 horses, a covered stud livestock-selling area with seating for 660 people and truck and camping facilities for 195 vehicles. Associations for Appaloosas horses, all breeds, Western Performance, Australian Stock Horses, Pony Clubs and cutting horses all use the centre.

Retail 

Tamworth is the largest and main retail centre for the New England and North West Slopes regions of New South Wales. Retail accounts for 22.5% of the working population and is the largest employer in the town.

Peel Street is the major retail and shopping area of Tamworth and is located in the Tamworth Central Business District. Three blocks of Peel St were refurbished over different stages during the 1990s. There are a few hundred shops in the main street, as well as restaurants, street cafés and banks. These include a large Target department store (formerly Grace Bros.).

There are many shopping centres located in Tamworth, with the majority being located in the Tamworth Central Business District (CBD), but many are also located in various neighbourhood suburbs. Shopping centres include:
Tamworth town Plaza is located in the CBD, with 42 shops including Coles and Kmart.
Centrepoint Shopping Centre is a  shopping centre that was completed by Christmas 2008 behind the Tamworth Town Hall, in the CBD between the old town library and behind the speciality shops in the main street Peel St. The Centre contains an Aldi supermarket, as well as The Forum 6 Cinema Complex that contains five cinemas and a performing arts centre/theatre known as the Capitol Theatre that also doubles as a cinema, six restaurants, a food court and 40 speciality shops. In 2012 It was announced that Aldi and JB Hi-Fi would be located within the centre, replacing Franklins.
The Atrium, formerly known as the Tamworth Arcade, is located in the CBD with entrances from Peel St and Kable Avenue.
Eastpoint Shopping Centre Tamworth, located in the CBD on Peel St and includes Woolworths and Dan Murphy's.
Tamworth Shopping World is located in West Tamworth along Bridge St, with over 50 speciality shops, including a food court and anchored by Woolworths and Big W.
Northgate Shopping Centre is situated in North Tamworth; Coles is located inside the centre, as well as 10 speciality shops. The centre has been recently redeveloped. Restroom facilities are available for all shoppers, as well as ATM facilities.
Southgate Shopping Centre in South Tamworth is home to Coles and other speciality shops. The centre was the first mall to be built in Tamworth. In 2012 Southgate undertook a redevelopment, where the centre received a much needed facelift and Coles replaced Bi-Lo.
Tamworth Homespace is located out at the Longyard. It is a bulk goods complex. It also contains two large gyms (Jetts 24hr Fitness and Inspirations) and Bibs and Ribs steak house.
Calala Court shopping complex, located in Calala, was opened in 2007. It has 10 speciality shops and an IGA supermarket.

Tourism
Tourism is a significant industry in the Tamworth area, worth $AUD239 million annually as at December 2014, with by far the most significant draw being the annual Tamworth Country Music Festival, the biggest event of its type in Australia and the Southern Hemisphere. Other attractions include Tamworth's museums and galleries. Nearby destinations include several country towns, including Barraba, popular for birdwatching, Nundle, and Quirindi.

Country Music Festival

Tamworth is best known for hosting the annual Tamworth Country Music Festival (TCMF) over a period of 10 days from Friday to Sunday in mid to late January, sometimes including Australia Day. TCMF is the second biggest country music festival in the world. It features thousands of Australian and international country music artists performing live shows 24 hours a day. Each year, an estimated 100,000 people pass through Tamworth for the festival. Around 70,000 stay for a substantial duration, with some camping along the banks of the Peel River.

On the last Saturday of each TCMF, the Toyota Country Music Cavalcade is held in Peel Street (the main street), featuring many country music artists. The festival culminates in the prestigious Golden Guitar Awards. Tamworth otherwise honours country music by being home to the 'Big Golden Guitar', the Wax Museum, and the Hands of Fame Park.

Vehicle manufacturing
In the 1990s, Ansair established a bus bodying factory in Tamworth to body Scania and Volvo buses for Brisbane Transport and the State Transit Authority. Jakab Industries also bodied buses, ambulances and postal vans between 1973 and 2002.

Venues

Tamworth Capitol Theatre
The Tamworth Capitol Theatre is fitted with a 405-seat auditorium with two levels of tiered seating, professional theatre lighting, a full sound system, dressing rooms, an orchestra pit, and fly tower, and is fully air conditioned. It is a multifunctional space for live theatre and cinema productions. It has significantly added to the existing cultural facilities in the region and provides a forum for live theatre, including dance, drama, music, educational activities, conferences and community events.
During the Country Music Festival The Capitol Theatre is host to three independent shows per day.

Tamworth Town Hall
The Tamworth Town Hall, located in the Tamworth Central Business District, is a historical building used for events, conferences and concerts. Additionally, it is commonly used for career expos, antique shows, meetings and conventions. It was built in 1934, has a proscenium stage, a gallery and a seating capacity of 1074 people.

Tamworth Regional Entertainment Centre

Tamworth Regional Entertainment Centre is located in the suburb of Hillvue. It is a multipurpose centre with a seating capacity of 5,100, and is the biggest of its kind outside the New South Wales and south-east Queensland metropolitan areas.

Education

University of New England
University of Newcastle
TAFE New England
Calrossy Anglican School 
Carinya Christian School
Farrer Memorial Agricultural High School
Hillvue Public School
Liberty College
McCarthy Catholic College
Nemingha Public School
Oxley High School
Peel High School
St Nicholas Catholic Primary School
St Edwards Catholic Primary School
St Joseph's Catholic Primary School
Tamworth Public School
Tamworth High School
Tamworth South Public School
Tamworth West Public School
Westdale Public School

Culture and recreation

Sport
Sport is a very important part of Tamworth culture, and over 50 different sports and recreational pursuits are participated in by the community. Many major annual and one-off sporting events are held in the town because of the wide range of facilities and venues available. There are over 180 sporting clubs in the Tamworth region and the region has several strong competitions, including basketball, cricket, football (soccer), field hockey, netball, rugby league, rugby union, and Aussie rules football. As a result, the town has produced many sportspeople, including test cricketers, Olympic shooters and hockey players, and many players in the National Rugby League. The Northern Inland Academy of Sport is one important institution in the town that has helped talented sportspeople to establish themselves "on and off the field". It was established in 1992 and has a wide range of community support.

During the Queen's Birthday long weekend in June, Tamworth hosts a Baseball tournament with teams competing from all over NSW and QLD.

Facilities
Located within the town are an athletic track, Australian football grounds, badminton courts, baseball diamonds, indoor basketball courts, indoor and outdoor cricket pitches, croquet turf, cycling (velodrome and bmx track), two 18-hole golf courses, a gymnastic centre, water bases hockey fields, the Australian Equine and Livestock Events Centre used for equine sports, eleven bowling turfs, a kart-racing track, a speedway track and a motocross track, netball courts: twelve asphalt courts, 30 grass courts and an indoor synthetic court, an inline hockey court, rugby league and union fields (nine senior fields and seven junior fields). Shooting sports have a 3 x 25 m standard pistol range, 1 x 10m air pistol range, 1 x 100m free and action pistol range; 1 x 50m service pistol range and 1 x 100m rifle range. Soccer fields include six senior fields, 8 junior fields and an indoor standard court. Two international standard softball diamonds and ten competition standard diamonds are available. Squash courts, two olympic swimming pools and one indoor pool, tennis courts (two hardcourts, 17 synthetic courts, 8 clay courts and one indoor synthetic court), two tenpin bowling centres, 16 touch football/Oztag fields, two indoor volleyball courts and three beach courts, as well as 2 water polo competition level pools are located there.

Senior sports teams

Performing arts
 CAPERS is a show hosted at Tamworth Regional Entertainment Centre every two years to showcase the talent of students (both primary and high school) from the North-West region public schools.
 The Northwest Dance Festival has been held various times in Tamworth at the Tamworth Regional Entertainment Centre. This includes a wide variety of dances from all the public schools in the region.
 The Tamworth Eisteddfod is held annually in May and June, with Speech and Drama, Debating, Music and Dance sections at the Tamworth Town Hall.
 The Tamworth Musical Society is an important part of the Tamworth culture, and has performed musicals such as "Grease", "Westside Story", and "Les Misérables" in October–November 2007 at the Tamworth Capitol Theatre. 
 The Tamworth Regional Conservatorium of Music is another important part of the performing arts scene in Tamworth. Over 1000 students learn many instruments from experienced and qualified teachers. It is the largest regional conservatorium in the state behind Wollongong, with students ranging in age from four to 75 years old, learning over 21 different instruments.

Parks

The many important parks in the town of Tamworth include Anzac Park, Bicentennial Park and The Tamworth Regional Botanic Gardens. The botanical gardens were established in 1995 and are run by the Tamworth Regional Council. Bicentennial Park is characterisd by its stagnant waters and high population of wild ducks. The gardens conserve the flora of the region, as well as include flora and plant displays from various parts of Australia and the world.

Heritage listings
Tamworth has a number of heritage-listed sites, including:
 Fitzroy Street: Tamworth Post Office
 King George V Memorial Avenue (East): King George V Avenue of Memorial English Oaks
 Main Northern railway: Peel River railway bridge
 Main Northern railway: Tamworth railway station
 Marius Street (East): Dominican Roman Catholic Convent
 Peel Street (cnr): Tamworth Peel Barracks

The following buildings in Tamworth are listed on the now defunct Register of the National Estate:
 Hospital Main Block, built 1883
 Lands Office, Fitzroy Street, built 1889
 Post Office, Victorian Classical style, designed by Colonial Architect James Barnet, circa 1886
 Public School, Upper Street, built 1885

Museums

Tamworth Power Station Museum
Tamworth was the first town in Australia to light its streets by municipally generated electritown in 1888. A larger power station was established in 1923 at a site in Marius Street, East Tamworth due to the high demand of electritown and the main building was demolished in 1982. The Tamworth Power Station Museum's purpose is to tell the story of the town's role in the development of electric street lighting, from the early days of oil lamps in 1876 and gas lamps in 1882, through to the installation of the first electric lights in November 1888. The museum has one of Australia's largest collections of early 20th century electrical appliances.

Powerhouse Motorcycle Museum
The Powerhouse Motorcycle Museum holds more than 50 motorcycles spanning from the 1950s to the 1980s. The museum specialises in Ducati, Triumph, Honda, Velocette and Laverda. The museum holds an example of the limited edition MV Agusta F4 Serie Oro.

Churches

Since 2000, the Combined Churches of Tamworth have run a free to the public festival called "Lifefest" in Bicentennial Park. The event is run on a Saturday in July in conjunction with Fusion Tamworth and with the support of Tamworth Regional Council. The family day celebrates National Thanksgiving Day and involves various stalls with free food, drinks, games, and showbags, as well as a drama presentation, music performances, and displays from police, fire brigade and ambulance personnel; 2007 attracted a crowd of a few thousand to the festival in the park.

Media
Tamworth serves as the regional centre for media in the New England District. Much of the region's history is stored in its original form at the Tamworth Regional Film and Sound Archive – a volunteer organisation hosted by the Tamworth Regional Council – and their database is available online. In 1970, the town (city hall, main street, swimming pool, Hoyts drive-in, and station) and region served as the setting for the Judy vignette in the 1971 film 3 to Go.

Newspapers
Northern Daily Leader is a long-running daily local paper (Monday to Saturday), with local and regional coverage, owned by Fairfax.
Tamworth Times is a free weekly paper owned by Fairfax.

Television
Tamworth is served by three commercial and two public television services, each having their respective primary and multichannel services across the North West region:
Seven (formerly Prime7), 7Two, 7mate, 7Bravo, 7flix – Seven Network owned and operated.
Nine (NBN Television), 9Go!, 9Gem, 9Life – Nine Network owned and operated.
10, 10 Peach, 10 Bold – (Owned by WIN Corporation), Network Ten affiliate.
Australian Broadcasting Corporation, ABC, ABC TV Plus, ABC Me, ABC News
Special Broadcasting Service, SBS, SBS Viceland, SBS Food, NITV

Of the three main commercial networks:
Prime7 News airs a half-hour local news bulletin for the North West at 6pm each weeknight. It is produced from a local newsroom in the city and broadcast from studios in Canberra.
NBN Television airs NBN News, a regional hour-long program including opt-outs for the North West, every night at 6pm. It is broadcast from studios in Newcastle with reporters based at a local newsroom in the city.
WIN Television airs short local news updates throughout the day, broadcast from its Wollongong studios.

Subscription television services are provided by Austar.

Radio
The Australian Broadcasting Corporation (ABC) operate and broadcast five radio stations:
ABC New England North West 648 AM / 99.1 FM – part of the ABC Local Radio network
ABC News Radio 91.7 FM
ABC Radio National 93.9 FM / 100.7 FM
ABC Classic FM 96.7 FM / 103.1 FM
Triple J 94.7 FM / 99.9 FM
2TM Tamworth 1287AM - Tamworth's first radio station
92.9FM
88.9fm New England Northwest 96.3fm Liverpool Plains

Several other radio stations are based in the town, including 2TM, general community station 88.9 FM, Christian community radio station Radio Rhema 89.7 FM, and hit music station FM 92.9. The community radio stations both broadcast from Bald Hill. FM 92.9 and 2TM are owned by the Broadcast Operations Group, branded as the "Super Radio Network".

Transport

Tamworth Airport has daily flights to Sydney Airport with QantasLink, and previously by Virgin Australia. Regional carrier Fly Corporate, now known as Link Airways, began a regular service between Brisbane and Tamworth on 31 October 2016.

Tamworth station is situated on the Main Northern railway line. Trains no longer continue all the way to the Queensland border, but the town is still served by the NSW TrainLink Xplorer service between Sydney and Armidale, where daily coaches continue to Tenterfield. Other NSW TrainLink coaches operate to Inverell. Until November 2009, Pacific National operated a regular fuel service from Sydney, carrying 30 million litres (6,600,000 imp gal; 7,900,000 US gal) of fuel a year to Tamworth and Dubbo. It was the last freight service to serve the town; in the 1980s, up to six trains a day ran.

Tamworth is served by thrice-weekly bus services to Coffs Harbour and Brisbane by New England Coaches. Greyhound Australia stopped servicing Tamworth in 2016 citing unprofitable passenger loadings.

Local services are provided by Tamworth Buslines who also provides interurban services to nearby Quirindi (Rt 428), Manila (Rt 443) and Bendemeer (Rt 444)

Sister cities
Tamworth has the following sister cities:

Attractions

 Calala Cottage
 Endeavour Park (Marsupial Park)
 Golden Guitar
 Oxley Park Lookout
 PowerStation Museum
 Tamworth Regional Botanic Gardens
 Tamworth Regional Gallery
 The Big Big Mac
 Wax Museum

Military history
During World War II, Tamworth was the location of RAAF No.20 Inland Aircraft Fuel Depot (IAFD), completed in 1942 and closed on 14 June 1944. Usually consisting of 4 tanks, 31 fuel depots were built across Australia for the storage and supply of aircraft fuel for the RAAF and the US Army Air Forces at a total cost of £900,000 ($1,800,000).

Notable people
Academic
 Bronwyn Davies – Independent scholar and Professorial Fellow, University of Melbourne; author
Stephen R Kane – Associate Professor of Planetary Astrophysics, University of California, Riverside
Warren R Rodwell – University teacher, hostage survivor, lyricist

Arts, entertainment and media
 Peter Cousens – Actor
 Mark Ferguson – TV newsreader
 Belinda Giblin – Actress
 Kylie Gillies – TV presenter, co-host
 Pixie Jenkins – Musician
 Ezra Lee – Musician, singer, songwriter
 Tony Martin – Actor
 Lawrie Minson – Musician, songwriter
 Matt Moran – Chef, TV personality
 Philip Quast – Actor, singer 
 Ivan Sen – Film director, writer
 Rebecca Smart – Actress
 Don Spencer – Musician, author, TV presenter
 Felicity Urquhart – Singer, songwriter

Politics
 Mark Coulton – Politician; National Party member for the Division of Parkes
 Kevin Humphries – Politician; National Party member of the NSW Legislative Assembly
 Barnaby Joyce – Politician; Former leader of the National Party and Deputy Prime Minister of Australia
 Andrew Wilkie – Politician; independent federal member for the Division of Denison
 Tony Windsor – Retired politician; independent member for the Division of New England

Sport
 Clive Barton – Skeet shooter
 George Barton – Shooter
 David Brooks – Rugby league player
 Jamie Dwyer – Hockey player
 Elton Flatley -  Rugby Union player
 John Gleeson – Cricketer
 Phil Graham – Rugby league player 
 Josh Hazlewood – Cricketer
 Troy Hearfield – Soccer player
 Mark Hensby – Golfer
 Craig Jones – Cricketer
 Nick Kay – Basketballer 
 Tom Learoyd-Lahrs – Rugby league
 Greg McNamara – Boxer 
 Ethan Parry – Rugby league player
 Matt Parsons – Rugby league player
 Shane Rodney – Rugby league player
 Paddy Ryan – Rugby union player
 Matthew Smith – Hockey player
 Emelyn Starr – Tennis player
 Richard Swain – Rugby league player
 Peter Taylor – Rugby league player 
 Brad Tighe – Rugby league player
 Alan Tongue – Rugby league player
 Ross Warner – Rugby league player
 Michael York – Hockey player

See also

 List of world's largest roadside attractions

References

External links

 Tamworth Regional Council
 Tourism Tamworth
 Northern Daily Leader – Newspaper
 Country Music Festival Page
Tamworth -VisitNSW.com
 Tamworth, Australia statistics - ZhujiWorld.com

North West Slopes
Populated places established in 1850
 
Towns in New England (New South Wales)
Towns in New South Wales
1850 establishments in Australia

es:Tamworth